Old Red Cracker (abbreviated +ORC) is an anonymous reverser. He was one of the pioneers of publishing cracking lessons on the Internet. While his identity is unknown, reverse engineer Fravia had email correspondence with him and spread his tutorials.

Old Red Cracker founded the so-called "High Cracking University" (+HCU), to conduct research into Reverse Code Engineering (RCE). The addition of the "+" sign in front of the nickname of a reverser signified membership in the +HCU. +HCU published a new reverse engineering problem annually.

See also
Security hacker
Software cracking

Notes and references

External links 
http://www.woodmann.com/crackz/Orc.htm
In search of an Enigma - the Hunt for the Old Red Cracker

Unidentified people
Hacking (computer security)